In mathematics, especially in topology, equidimensionality is a property of a space that the local dimension is the same everywhere.

Definition (topology)
A topological space X is said to be equidimensional if for all points p in X, the dimension at p, that is dim p(X), is constant. The Euclidean space is an example of an equidimensional space. The disjoint union of two spaces X and Y (as topological spaces) of different dimension is an example of a non-equidimensional space.

Definition (algebraic geometry)

A scheme S is said to be equidimensional if every irreducible component has the same Krull dimension. For example, the affine scheme Spec k[x,y,z]/(xy,xz), which intuitively looks like a line intersecting a plane, is not equidimensional.

Cohen–Macaulay ring
An affine algebraic variety whose coordinate ring is a Cohen–Macaulay ring is equidimensional.

References

Mathematical terminology
Topology